Stranahan's Colorado Whiskey is a 94 proof, small batch whiskey distilled in Denver, Colorado. Stranahan's was the first modern microdistillery to legally make whiskey in Colorado, and an early craft whiskey distiller in the United States.

History
Stranahan's was founded by Jess Graber and George Stranahan, after whom the whiskey is named, in Colorado in 2004. In 1998, Graber, a volunteer firefighter, met Stranahan, the founder and owner of Flying Dog Brewery, while fighting a fire at Stranahan's barn. They struck up a conversation about whiskey, and were soon in business together. One of the first craft whiskey distillers in the US, Stranahan's is said to have "kicked off the Colorado distilling craze" with its whiskey and the designation it invented, Rocky Mountain Whiskey. It was Colorado's first microdistillery, and the state's first legal distillery since Prohibition.

The first batch of Stranahan's Colorado Whiskey was distilled in 2004 and bottled in 2006. Stranahan's was sold to New Jersey-based Proximo Spirits in 2010, with operations remaining in Colorado. By 2012, Proximo had increased whiskey production from around 12 barrels per week to 30, with plans to grow into the high forties. Stranahan's was sold in 38 states and 7 countries until 2010, when Proximo decided to scale down sales to mostly the Colorado area, maintaining the whiskey's availability in its home state.

Until 2019, Rob Dietrich had served as Stranahan's head distiller, after taking over from the founding head distiller Jake Norris. Dietrich was followed by Owen Martin, who in late 2022 took a position with Angel's Envy.

Product description

Distillation and aging
Stranahan's is a straight whiskey, aged in new charred oak barrels, like bourbon, with the final whiskey a blend of 2, 3 and 5 year-old whiskeys. It is distilled from a 100% malt barley base grain, with four barleys sourced from the Colorado area, and water sourced from the Eldorado spring outside Boulder. Stranahan's initially used wash from Flying Dog Brewery, before moving to a larger facility and making their own wash beginning in 2009.

Packaging
Each barrel is bottled by hand, with each label hand-signed by the distiller, often including a note about, for instance, the music listened to during the whiskey's production. The bottling process is done by volunteers, who receive a free tour and a bottle of Stranahan's for their efforts. Volunteers can sign up online on the Stranahan's website - a random lottery picks volunteers from this list for each bottling crew. Current estimates show the waiting list to be 20,000+ people long. The bottle features a metal cap, inspired by the old barroom practice of covering bottles with tin cups when the corks dry out.

Stranahan's Blue Peak Whiskey
In 2020, Stranahan’s added Blue Peak to its line of Rocky Mountain whiskeys. In this process, they couple the high altitude distillation process and aging methods with a Solera finish, a maturation process typically used in wine, resulting in a rich and mellow whiskey. This is bottled at 43% ABV and is said the lowest-priced Stranahan's introduced to date

Stranahan's Mountain Angel 10-Year-Old Whiskey 
As a one time only release in 2020, Stranahan's released Mountain Angel 10-Year-Old whiskey. This was the brand’s oldest, rarest release to date. They say it is the first and only American single malt of its kind aged 10 years in new charred American oak casks with less than 500 bottles available at 47.3% ABV. They have since released a batch two that consisted of 600 bottles and now a batch 3, which is available at a lower proof of 45.1% ABV.

Stranahan's Osopher 11-Year-Old Whiskey 
In 2022, Stranahan's did a limited release named Osopher which was an age-statement 11-Year-Old whiskey at 47.3% ABV finished in Imperial Porter barrels. This release was done in collaboration with Flying Dog Brewery, the beer brewery started by Stranahan's co-founder and namesake George Stranahan, who had died one year earlier. At 11 years, this whiskey dethroned Stranahans' own Mountain Angel as the oldest age-statement American single malt at the time.

Snowflake Series
Once a year, Stranahan's creates a limited Snowflake Series, available for purchase only at the Denver distillery, and so called because each batch is unique, like a snowflake. In the Snowflake Series, the standard Stranahan's whiskey is finished in oak casks previously filled with wine from local wineries or other spirits, sitting in the casks for roughly 18 months. When new bottles of Snowflake are set to be released, Stranahan's makes an announcement on their Facebook and Twitter accounts, and people typically camp outside by the distillery the night before the release to secure a bottle.

Beer
In 2012, Stranahan's began collaborating with Colorado's Breckenridge Brewery to create Stranahan's Well Built E.S.B., an English style bitter style ale 7.8% abv beer brewed by Breckenridge and aged in Stranahan's Colorado Whiskey barrels for three months.

Television and film 
Stranahan's was featured in "Whiskey", an episode of the History Channel's Modern Marvels that originally aired on March 17, 2008.

Stranahan's appears to be the whiskey of choice for character Marty Kaan in the Showtime series House of Lies.

Stranahan's is consumed by Morgan Freeman's character "Monty Wildhorn" in the 2012 film The Magic of Belle Isle.

Honors and awards
 Numerous batches received "Liquid Gold" status from Jim Murray's Whisky Bible 2014
 American Distilling Institute's gold medal winner, 2008
 Whisky Advocate Artisan Whiskey of the Year, 2009
 Jim Murray's Whiskey Bible 2009, small batch distillery of the year, 2009
 Malt Advocate Whisky of the Year, 2009
 Malt Advocate Best Artisanal Whiskey, 2010

References

External links
 Official website

Whiskies of the United States
Companies based in Colorado
Distilleries in Colorado
Products introduced in 2004